Volno-Sukharevo is a rural locality (a village) in Nikolayevsky Selsoviet, Ufimsky District, Bashkortostan, Russia. The population was 177 as of 2010. There are 2 streets.

Geography 
Volno-Sukharevo is located 38 km northwest of Ufa (the district's administrative centre) by road. Nurlino is the nearest rural locality.

References 

Rural localities in Ufimsky District